David Oliver (January 31, 1962 – November 12, 1992) was an American stage, film and television actor.

Career
Oliver was one of eight children born to Pat and William Oliver in Concord, California. He began his acting career in 1982. From 1983 to 1985, Oliver played the role of Perry Hutchins on the daytime soap opera Another World. In 1986, he played the role of Sam Gardner in the miniseries A Year in the Life. He starred as Chad Anderson in the soap Santa Barbara (1986). The miniseries then became a regular series in the fall of 1987 on NBC for one season.  Oliver's wife in both the miniseries and regular series was played by Sarah Jessica Parker. He also appeared in several stage roles including the San Diego Civic Light Opera's productions of The Unsinkable Molly Brown and Li'l Abner. Oliver was also one of the founding members of Young Artists United. Shortly before his death, he had a role in the play Elegies staged at the Canon Theater in Beverly Hills.

Death
On November 12, 1992, Oliver died at his Los Angeles home of complications due to AIDS. His memorial service was held on November 18 at Forest Lawn Memorial Park in the Hollywood Hills.

Filmography

References

External links

1962 births
1992 deaths
20th-century American male actors
AIDS-related deaths in California
American male film actors
American male musical theatre actors
American male soap opera actors
American male stage actors
American male television actors
American gay actors
Male actors from California
People from Concord, California
20th-century American singers
20th-century American male singers
20th-century American LGBT people